Kampeska may refer to:

 Lake Kampeska, a glacial lake in South Dakota.
 Kampeska, South Dakota, an unincorporated community in Codington County, South Dakota.